The pasture day moth (Apina callisto) is a species in the moth family Noctuidae which is active during the day, as its common name implies, making it unlike most other noctuid species. It is found in most southern areas of Australia, ranging from lower Queensland to Tasmania. The species was first described by George French Angas in 1847. It is the only species in the monotypic genus Apina, erected by Francis Walker in 1855.

The pasture day moth lays its eggs in pastures, and they hatch after heavy rains in early spring. They have striking coloration; two yellow stripes run down their mottled-black back, interspersed with blue spots. Their bodies are covered with white spines. They feed on various broad leaved plants (see list below).

Its thorax is black and the abdomen is orange, ringed with black.

Recorded food plants 

Arctotheca - capeweed
Erodium - storksbill
Lepidium
Malva - mallow
Modiola - bristle mallow
Plantago - plantain
Poaceae - grasses (including Paspalum)
Rumex
Salvia - sage
Sonchus - sow-thistle
Trifolium - clover
Rumex

References

External links
"Apina callisto (pasture day moth)". Ecowatch. Archived 29 September 2004.
"Pasture day moth Apina callisto". PestWeb. Archived 11 October 2004.

Apina
Moths described in 1847
Taxa named by George French Angas
Monotypic moth genera